For the Cause of Suffrage is a 1909 silent comedy film. It stars Francis Ford. It was produced by Gaston Méliès and copyrighted by Georges Méliès.

Plot
Mr. Duff dresses as a woman and infiltrates a women's suffrage meeting.

See also
 Women's suffrage in film

References

External link
 

1909 films
Silent comedy films
1909 comedy films